The Adobe Glyph List (AGL) is a mapping of 4,281 glyph names to one or more Unicode characters. Its purpose is to provide an implementation guideline for consumers of fonts (mainly software applications); it lists a variety of standard names that are given to glyphs that correspond to certain Unicode character sequences. The AGL is maintained by Adobe Systems.

For producers of fonts, Adobe suggests a more limited set of names, the Adobe Glyph List for New Fonts (AGLFN), based on an earlier version of the AGL. Names not in the AGLFN are to be constructed by standard heuristics described in Unicode and Glyph Names.

AGL and AGLFN, along with related resources, are currently maintained and available at the AGL & AGLFN open source project.

Adobe Latin 
The Adobe Latin (AL) is a mapping of 1,307 (pre-composed) glyph names. These character sets are informative, not normative, and some have changed since they were first issued. For example, the original version of AL3 did not include the Turkish lira nor the ruble.

 Adobe Latin 1= 229 glyphs, formerly ISO-Adobe
 Adobe Latin 2 = 250 glyphs, formerly Adobe Western 2
 Adobe Latin 3 = 329 glyphs, Adobe Western 2 + CE, the basic western "Pro" font charset
 Adobe Latin 4 = 616 glyphs, Adobe Western 2 + CE + most of WGL-4 + Vietnamese + (a few things)
 Adobe Latin 5 = 1119 glyphs, all the Above + more accented characters + phonetics and transliteration needs

Adobe Latin Glyph List

Adobe Latin 1

Adobe Latin 2

Adobe Latin 3

Adobe Latin 4 
Combined Characters

Pre-composed Characters

Adobe Latin 5

See also
 Windows Glyph List 4

External links
 Adobe Glyph List - the actual mapping for font consumers
 Adobe Glyph List for New Fonts - the actual mapping for font producers
 ITC Zapf Dingbats Glyph List - the actual mapping for Zapf dingbat glyphs
 Unicode and Glyph Names - Adobe's explanatory material about heuristics for glyph naming/decoding and the use of AGL and AGLFN

Glyphs
Adobe typefaces